Bam Bahadur Kunwar Rana (1818–1857) was the 9th Prime Minister of the government of Nepal. He was brother of Jung Bahadur Rana.

References

Books
Joshi B. L., Rose L. E. (1966), Democratic Innovations in Nepal: A Case Study of Political Acculturation, pp. 31, University of California Press, California, USA
Whelpton J. (2005), A History of Nepal, pp. 243, Press Syndicate of the University of Cambridge, Cambridge, UK

1818 births
1857 deaths
Prime ministers of Nepal
19th-century Nepalese politicians
19th-century prime ministers of Nepal
19th-century Nepalese nobility
Rana dynasty
Khas people